Edward C. Baig is an American technology columnist. He is the Personal Tech writer for USA Today where he reviews the newest gadgets and consumer technology trends. Baig is also responsible for writing on the future of robotics.

Education
Baig obtained his bachelor's degree in political science from York College and in 1982 received his MBA from Adelphi University.

Career
Baig has worked at Business Week, U.S. News & World Report and Fortune Magazine. From 1978 to 1990, he worked for Fortune Magazine. Here he covered leisure industries and created Fortune's Products to Watch column. In 1990, Baig decided to work for U.S. News & World Report in Washington, D.C., as an associate editor where he was responsible for covering personal technology. He then worked for Business Week in New York, New York, and Washington, D.C., from 1993 to 1999. Here he was department editor and covered personal technology and personal finance. He presently works with USA Today.

Awards and honors
In 1999, he won Northwestern's Medill School of Journalism Award for "Best Feature on a Personal Finance Topic".

Publications
He has written a software book called Mac for Dummies.

References

s

American columnists
American technology writers
Living people
Year of birth missing (living people)